Ted Bucklin (May 9, 1903 – October 19, 1945) was an American football fullback. He played for the Chicago Cardinals in 1927 and for the New York Giants in 1931. Bucklin died as a result of an illness.

References

1903 births
1945 deaths
American football fullbacks
Idaho Vandals football players
Chicago Cardinals players
New York Giants players
Players of American football from Idaho
People from Idaho Falls, Idaho